The Norddeutsche Philharmonie Rostock, based in Rostock, Mecklenburg-Vorpommern, Germany, is the state's largest symphony orchestra and also the orchestra of the Volkstheater Rostock. Founded in 1897, the orchestra grew to 90 musicians by 1991. They were rewarded a prize for ambitious programs in 1993.

History 
The Norddeutsche Philharmonie Rostock dates back to 1897, when the Leipzig Kapellmeister Heinrich Schulz was commissioned as music director of Rostock to found an orchestra of at least 34 well-trained musicians. On 22 September 1897, the founding concert of this orchestra, named Rostocker Stadt- und Theaterorchester (Rostock municipal and theatre orchestra), took place under his direction in Rostock's then Apollo Hall with Les Préludes by Franz Liszt and Beethoven's Symphony No. 8. In 1914, the orchestra was renamed Städtisches Orchester, now managed by the city of Rostock.

Gerd Puls in particular shaped the development of the orchestra in the post-war period. During his 34 years as Generalmusikdirektor, he led his orchestra to the status of an A orchestra in 1973. In 1990, the orchestra was named Norddeutsche Philharmonie Rostock. His successor Michael Zilm took over in 1991, with an orchestra of 90 musicians. He was able to perform Gustav Mahler's orchestral works including the Second Symphony, and led the orchestra on a tour of Sweden with Mahler's Seventh Symphony in 1995. Other programs of the 1990s focuses on 20th-century music by composers such as Arnold Schönberg, Paul Hindemith and Alban Berg. Within this framework, the orchestra recorded the music by Hans Peter Ströer for Heinrich Breloer's film Buddenbrooks. In 2002, the orchestra made the first recording of Karl Weigl's Piano Concerto for the left hand, with Florian Krumpöck as the soloist and conducted by Manfred Hermann.

Zilm, who became honorary conductor, was succeeded by Mikhail Jurowski in 1997, Wolf-Dieter Hauschild in 2002, Peter Leonard in 2004, Niklas Willén in 2007, and from 2011 the conductor and pianist Krumpöck. The orchestra continued to be threatened by austerity measures by the city of Rostock and the state of Mecklenburg-Vorpommern. Several years followed without a general music director. In 2017, the orchestra received financial support from a national program "Exzellente Orchesterlandschaft Deutschland", for the promotion of contemporary music and educational projects. Marcus Bosch took over as conductor in residence in 2018, and became chief conductor in 2020.

The orchestra was the first symphony orchestra in Germany to resume playing with all members after the restrictions due to the COVID-19 pandemic, playing in September 2020 Bruch's Violin Concerto and Mahler's Fourth Symphony.

Musical directors 
The following individuals have held the position of the orchestra's musical director:
 1897–1924: Heinrich Schulz
 1928–1931: Hans Schmidt-Isserstedt
 1931–1938: Adolf Wach
 1938–1945: Heinz Schubert
 1948–1949: Gerhard Pflüger
 1949–1951: Fritz Müller
 1951–1954: Heinz Röttger
 1954–1955: Hans Gahlenbeck
 1955–1957: Gerhart Wiesenhütter
 1957–1991: Gerd Puls
 1991–1997: Michael Zilm
 1997–1999: Michail Jurowski
 2002–2004: Wolf-Dieter Hauschild (honorary conductor since 2004)
 2004–2007: Peter Leonard
 2009–2011: Niklas Willén
 2011–2014: Florian Krumpöck
 2020–present: Marcus Bosch (principal conductor, from 2018 conductor in residence)

Awards 
In 1993, the orchestra was awarded the prize of the German Music Publishers Association for its ambitious programming with GMD Michael Zilm. In 1998, on the occasion of its 100th anniversary, the Norddeutsche Philharmonie Rostock received the Kulturpreis der Hansestadt Rostock.

References

External links 
 
 Volkstheater Rostock
 Philharmonische Gesellschaft Rostock (in German) Supporting association of the orchestra
 
 Norddeutsche Philharmonie Rostock (articles, in German) Neue Musikzeitung

Music in Mecklenburg-Western Pomerania
Music in Rostock
German symphony orchestras